Bell Green is predominantly a residential area of in the north east of Coventry, West Midlands, England about 2.5 miles from the city centre. It was once home to over 50 different types of shops but due to the current economic climate and the council charging high rental prices for out of town shopping, there now remains only a handful.

Riley Square

Bell Green has a shopping centre called Riley Square, which has a variety of shops surrounded by flats. There is also a public library and learning centre on the square. Bell Green health centre is situated just outside Riley Square.
Bell Green has high levels of social and economic deprivation and has experienced significant problems with low-level crime and antisocial behaviour, however, the crime rate is relatively low compared to neighbouring districts such as Wood End and Manor House.

Dewis House
It was completed in 1965, and contains 94 flats.

Henley College Coventry
Henley College Coventry, was built in the 1960s and provides education to over 5,000 part-time students and 1,600 full-time students.  The college is located on Henley Road, at the edge of Bell Green.

References

Suburbs of Coventry